The Notre Dame Fighting Irish men's lacrosse team represents the University of Notre Dame in NCAA Division I men's college lacrosse. Notre Dame competes as a member of the Atlantic Coast Conference and plays its home games at Arlotta Family Lacrosse Stadium or the indoor Loftus Sports Center before it is warm enough outside each season, in Notre Dame, Indiana.

History

Notre Dame men's lacrosse was a club sport until it became a varsity program in the 1981 season.  Current Notre Dame Athletic Director Jack Swarbrick was a midfielder on Notre Dame's club lacrosse team during his undergraduate years (1972–76) before the team acquired varsity status.  From 1981 to 1993, Notre Dame competed in the Midwest Lacrosse Association.  From 1994 to 2009, it was then a member of the Great Western Lacrosse League.  In 2010, it became a member of the newly established Big East men's lacrosse conference.  In 2012, Notre Dame announced that it would be joining the Atlantic Coast Conference. From 1981 to 1988, the program was led by head coach Rich O'Leary, who established a career record of 64–42 (.604), after which Kevin Corrigan took over as head coach, beginning in 1989.  Within ten years as a varsity program, the Fighting Irish made its first appearance in the NCAA championship tournament in 1990, and since then has regularly appeared there.  In 2001, the fifth-seeded Irish reached the semi-final round (Final Four) for the first time after defeating Bucknell 12–7 and fourth-seeded Johns Hopkins 13–9 in earlier rounds, and finished the season with a 14–2 record and a #4 ranking in the nation.

More recently, Notre Dame has made the NCAA championship tournament every year since 2006.  In 2009, the Irish went undefeated in the regular season, reaching #2 in national polls, and finished with an overall record of 15–1, with five players receiving All-America honors.  In the fall of 2009, Notre Dame opened its new lacrosse-specific outdoor stadium, Arlotta Stadium, with 2,500 seats, an artificial turf field, locker rooms, restrooms, and concession areas.  In 2010, the Irish began play in the new Big East men's lacrosse conference and went 7–6 in the regular season before advancing to the NCAA tournament as an unseeded selection, where it upset higher seeds Princeton, Maryland, and Cornell before being defeated by fifth-seeded Duke, 6–5 in overtime of the championship game. In 2011, Notre Dame went 10–2 in the regular season, reaching #1 in national polls, and advanced to the quarterfinal round of the NCAA tournament before losing to Duke, 7–5. In 2012, the Irish went 13–3, defeating ranked opponents Duke, Denver, Syracuse, and defending national champion Virginia before losing to the number one seed and eventual national champion Loyola 7–5 in the semi-final round of the NCAA Tournament. In 2013, the Irish finished with an 11–5 record and advanced to the quarterfinal round of the tournament, losing to eventual champion Duke, 12–11.

In the history of the program, Notre Dame has produced numerous All-Americans: Mike Iorio (1993, 1994, 1995); Randy Colley (1994, 1995); Todd Rassas (1996, 1997, 1998); Alex Cade (1996); Jimmy Keenan (1996, 1997, 1998); Chris Dusseau (1999); Tom Glatzel (2000, 2001); David Ulrich (2000, 2001); Kirk Howell (2001); Steve Bishko (2001); Mike Adams (2001); AJ Wright (2002); Pat Walsh (2003, 2004, 2005); DJ Driscoll (2005, 2006); Joey Kemp (2006, 2007, 2008); Brian Hubschmann (2007); Sean Dougherty (2007, 2008); Michael Podgajny (2007, 2008); Will Yeatman (2007); Ryan Hoff (2008, 2009); Regis McDermott (2009); Sam Barnes (2009); Grant Krebs (2009, 2010); Scott Rodgers (2009, 2010); Zach Brenneman (2010, 2011); David Earl (2010, 2011); Kevin Ridgway (2010, 2011); Sam Barnes (2011), Andrew Irving (2011), John Kemp (2011, 2012, 2013), Kevin Randall (2012), Jim Marlatt (2012, 2013), Matt Miller (2012, 2013), and Matt Kavanagh (2013, 2014).

In addition, several Notre Dame players have been Tewaaraton Trophy nominees: Tom Glatzel (2001), David Ulrich (2001), Pat Walsh (2004, 2005), Joey Kemp (2008), Scott Rodgers (2009, 2010), Grant Krebs (2010), David Earl (2011), Kevin Ridgway (2011), and John Kemp (2012, 2013)and Matt Landis (2016).

Under current coach Kevin Corrigan, the Irish have an overall record of 241–114 (.679) through the 2013 season.  The program has a 100% graduation rate since it was started in 1981.  Corrigan has been selected as the GWLL Coach of the Year fives times, including in 2009, which was the conference's final season before the establishment of the Big East men's lacrosse conference.

At the beginning of its games, the Irish team is traditionally led onto the playing field by a teammate playing the bagpipes, a tradition that was begun during the 1996 season by then-freshman Sean Meehan and has since been passed down to other players including Chad DeBolt, Daniel Hickey, Regis McDermott, Colt Power, Ryan Mix, and Edwin Glazener.

Season Results
The following is a list of Notre Dame's results by season as an NCAA Division I program:

{| class="wikitable"

|- align="center"

†NCAA canceled 2020 collegiate activities due to the COVID-19 virus.

Alumni in the Premier Lacrosse League (14)

References

External links
 

NCAA Division I men's lacrosse teams
Notre Dame Fighting Irish men's lacrosse
Lacrosse teams in Indiana
1981 establishments in Indiana
Lacrosse clubs established in 1981

es:Notre Dame Fighting Irish
fr:Fighting Irish de Notre Dame